Gbely (German and Hungarian: Egbell) is a town in the Skalica District, Trnava Region in western Slovakia, close to the Czech border.

History
The first written record about Gbely was in 1392. It gained town rights in the 16th–17th centuries. Petroleum was discovered in 1912 and extraction started in 1914.

Geography

Demographics
According to the 2001 census, the town had 5,223 inhabitants. 96.09% of inhabitants were Slovaks, 1.26% Czechs 0.96% Roma, and 1% Amit. The religious make-up was 83.40% Roman Catholics, 14.57% people with no religious affiliation and 0.69% Lutherans.

Notable Resident
Matej Kocak (1882–1918) Slovak-American World War I Medal of Honor recipient was born here.

Twin towns — sister cities

Gbely is twinned with:
 Židlochovice, Czech Republic
 Deutsch-Wagram, Austria

See also
 List of municipalities and towns in Slovakia

References

Genealogical resources

The records for genealogical research are available at the state archive "Statny Archiv in Bratislava, Slovakia"

 Roman Catholic church records (births/marriages/deaths): 1710-1904 (parish A)
 Lutheran church records (births/marriages/deaths): 1786-1895 (parish B)

External links

 Town website 
Surnames of living people in Gbely

Cities and towns in Slovakia